Hollingsworth v. Virginia, 3 U.S. (3 Dall.) 378 (1798), was a case in which the United States Supreme Court ruled early in America's history that the President of the United States has no formal role in the process of amending the United States Constitution and that the Eleventh Amendment was binding on cases already pending prior to its ratification.

Background
Levi Hollingsworth was a Pennsylvania merchant who owned shares in the Indiana Company, which was heavily involved in land speculation.  The Indiana Company was seeking to resolve a land claim with the state of Virginia regarding land in what is now West Virginia.  Hollingsworth replaced a previous plaintiff in the case, a Virginian named William Grayson.  This replacement was made when the U.S. Supreme Court decided in Chisholm v. Georgia (1793) that a state could be sued in federal court by a citizen of another state; Hollingsworth was from another state, whereas Grayson was not.  This derivative suit dragged on, and President John Adams announced on January 8, 1798 that the Eleventh Amendment was ratified.  That Amendment overturned Chisholm.

So, the first main issue in the case became whether the Eleventh Amendment was valid, not having been presented to the President for approval or veto.  The second main issue was whether the Eleventh Amendment applied retroactively to ongoing cases that had already begun before the Amendment was ratified.

The attorneys for Hollingsworth were William Tilghman and William Rawle.  They argued for presidential involvement in the amendment process (and against the constitutionality of the Eleventh Amendment), saying: "Upon an inspection of the original roll, it appears that the amendment was never submitted to the President for his approbation."  The proposed amendment had been laid before President George Washington merely "for transmission” to the states.

U.S. Attorney General Charles Lee took the position during oral argument in Hollingsworth that the Eleventh Amendment had been properly proposed, and Lee's argument was reproduced together with the opposing argument and the Court's decision in the case.  Here is the exchange between Attorney General Lee and Associate Justice Chase during oral argument:

Decision, rationale, and later discussion by the Court

The Court decided unanimously that the Eleventh Amendment had been validly adopted.  The Court also decided in Hollingsworth that it had no jurisdiction in the case, even though the case had arisen prior to ratification of the Eleventh Amendment.  Here is the full text of the Court's opinion:

In oral argument, Justice Samuel Chase had stated that the president "has nothing to do with the proposition, or adoption, of amendments to the Constitution".  The brief report by the reporter of decisions quotes Chase and the arguments of the opposing attorneys, but fails to explicitly give precise reasons for the Supreme Court's unanimous decision in this case, though it is known that none of the earlier amendments had been presented to the president for approbation either.

Article V of the Constitution says: "The Congress, whenever two thirds of both Houses shall deem it necessary, shall propose Amendments to this Constitution".  Congress thus may propose an amendment if there is a two-thirds vote of both houses of Congress, without waiting for a constitutional convention or a presidential signature or anything else, according to the decision in Hollingsworth. The clarity of this language in Article V has been cited as a reason why the Court did not think that further explanation of its decision was needed.

Although the Presentment Clause generally gives the president veto power, the ancient interpretive principle that the specific governs the general (generalia specialibus non derogant) is applicable to the specific circumstance of a constitutional amendment. Article V requires Congress to propose amendments, "whenever" it deems necessary by the same supermajority specified in the Presentment Clause, and therefore Congress has always treated the latter vote as unnecessary and inapplicable.

The question of whether the president can veto a proposed amendment was also answered negatively in INS v. Chadha (1983), albeit in dicta:

Hollingsworth remains good law.  Even those scholars who find it difficult to justify concede that it is firmly entrenched.

Instance of judicial review
Hollingsworth was one of the earliest instances of judicial review by the U.S. Supreme Court.  In this case, the Court decided whether the Eleventh Amendment would be upheld or stricken down.  Hollingsworth also may mark the first time that the Court struck down a federal law as unconstitutional, assuming that the Court in Hollingsworth was reading the Eleventh Amendment retroactively to invalidate part of the Judiciary Act of 1789.

However, there was an even earlier case, U.S. v. Todd (1794), that also may have held an act of Congress unconstitutional.  In 1800, Justice Chase implied that neither Hollingsworth nor Todd involved any unconstitutional federal statute: 

Assuming that Chase was correct, then perhaps Marbury v. Madison was the first such case.  Indeed, Walter Dellinger has written that the first judicial review of a constitutional amendment (in Hollingsworth) pre-dated the first invalidation of federal legislation (in Marbury).

Alternative theory about the case
In 2005, an article in the Texas Law Review by Seth B. Tillman theorized that it may be incorrect to interpret Hollingsworth as holding that constitutional amendment resolutions need not be presented to the President for possible veto.  This notwithstanding that the Court—in decisions issued in the twentieth century—itself has adopted that interpretation of its prior decision in Hollingsworth. Tillman did not suggest that Hollingsworth was wrongly decided, but only that its scope (as originally understood) might have been narrower than commonly thought today.

Tillman noted that Justice Chase's statement was not his official opinion, but merely a remark from the bench at oral argument, and therefore the failure of the other justices to contradict him should not elevate the status of Chase's remark to an official opinion by either him or by the Court.  Moreover, Tillman argued that there were several other grounds potentially explaining the Court's decision, including: that the proposed Eleventh Amendment was in fact delivered to George Washington, he declined to sign it, and Washington's non-signature did not amount to a pocket veto because Congress remained in session. If this latter explanation explains the Court's obscure language in its opinion, then the Court only decided that on the particular facts actually before it the Eleventh Amendment was valid.

Other explanations for the Hollingsworth holding are also possible. For example, Tillman also noted Chase's specific language at oral argument. Chase took the position that the president played no role in regard to the "proposition ... or adoption" of amendments. But the Court's actual opinion only used the "adoption" language, not the "proposition" language used by Chase at oral argument. This might lead to the conclusion that the Court was of the view that once  of the states had ratified a proposed amendment (i.e., how the amendment was "adopted"), then it was part of the Constitution without respect to potential defects in how an amendment (such as the Eleventh Amendment) was proposed.

During oral argument in Hollingsworth, U.S. Attorney General Lee advanced two independent arguments in support of the validity of the Eleventh Amendment (leaving aside his discussion of the issue of whether or not the amendment only had prospective effect). He argued that it was valid because presentment to the president was not necessary. Lee also argued that "the amendment was in due form" because it was enacted using the same procedures which were used in enacting the Bill of Rights. 3 U.S. 381.

Lee did not advance the alternative theory that the Eleventh Amendment was valid because George Washington declined to veto it.  If the Court adopted this position in Hollingsworth, which was one of the theories presented in the 2005  Texas Law Review article, then the Court silently based its decision in regard to a matter of law (not fact) on arguments which were not presented to it by one of the parties. On the other hand, Lee's "due form" argument is consistent with the text of the Court's decision. And once Chase had opened discussion distinguishing the proposition of amendments (by Congress) and their adoption (by the States), the parties were on notice that these issues were important to the Court. The parties had an opportunity to speak to these issues at oral argument. If they chose to neglect them, the Court could still address them, and arguably the Court did so in its decision.

Historian David E. Kyvig has argued that the Supreme Court in Hollingsworth adopted the position put forward by Attorney General Lee, although Kyvig published that argument several years prior to the 2005 article in the Texas Law Review. Kyvig suggests that the Court adopted Lee's position. However, Kyvig does not explain which of Lee's specific arguments were adopted by the Court or how the language in the Court's opinion explains the primary issue in the case: the scope of Article V and the scope of Article I, Section 7, Clause 3 and the interplay (if any) between the two provisions.

See also
 List of United States Supreme Court cases, volume 3

References

External links
 

1798 in United States case law
United States Supreme Court cases
United States Supreme Court cases of the Ellsworth Court
United States Constitution Article Five case law
United States Eleventh Amendment case law
Legal history of Virginia
1798 in Virginia